This was the first edition of the tournament.

Kaitlyn Christian and Giuliana Olmos won the title after defeating Viktorija Golubic and Amra Sadiković 7–5, 6–3 in the final.

Seeds

Draw

References
Main Draw

Central Coast Pro Tennis Open - Doubles